Edgar Richard Behr (12 September 1910 – 2 March 1985) was a sailor from Germany, who represented his country in the Snowbird in Los Angeles, United States.

References

External links
 
 
 

1910 births
1985 deaths
German male sailors (sport)
Olympic sailors of Germany
Sailors at the 1932 Summer Olympics – Snowbird